Winona County is a county in the U.S. state of Minnesota. As of the 2020 census, its population was 49,671. Its county seat is Winona. Winona County comprises the Winona, MN Micropolitan Statistical Area.

History

The Wisconsin Territory was established by the federal government effective July 3, 1836, and existed until its eastern portion was granted statehood (as Wisconsin) in 1848. The federal government set up the Minnesota Territory effective March 3, 1849. The newly organized territorial legislature created nine counties across the territory in October of that year. One of those original counties, Wabasha, had its southern section partitioned off on March 5, 1853, into a new county, Fillmore. On February 23, 1854, the legislature partitioned the northern part of Fillmore County, plus a small section of Wabasha, to create Winona County, with the village of Winona as county seat. The county name was taken from the village name, which is said to derive from a Dakota legend about a woman, Winona, (a relative of Chief Wabasha) who was betrothed to a warrior she did not love. Rather than marry him, she jumped to her death from a rock on Lake Pepin now called "Maiden's Rock". This is known as the Winona legend.

The county boundaries have remained unchanged since 1854.

Geography

Winona County lies on Minnesota's border with Wisconsin and is part of the driftless area that defines southeastern Minnesota, northeastern Iowa, southwestern Wisconsin and northwestern Illinois. The Mississippi, flowing south-southeast, defines the county's eastern border. The U.S. Army Corps of Engineers (St. Paul District) maintains the lock and dam system in this region.

The Whitewater River flows north-northeast through the northwest part of the county toward its discharge into the Mississippi just above Winona County. The eastern part of the county is drained into the Mississippi by east-flowing streams including Rollingstone Creek, Garvin Brook, Cedar Creek, and Big Trout Creek. The county terrain consists of low rolling hills with the east portion particularly etched by drainages, and lightly sprinkled with lakes. The land is devoted to agriculture where possible. The terrain slopes to the south and east, with its highest point at 1,365' (416m) ASL on a hill two miles (3 km) east of Wilson.

Within Minnesota, Winona County borders Wabasha County, Olmsted County, Fillmore County and Houston County.

Major highways

  Interstate 90
  U.S. Highway 14
  U.S. Highway 61
  Minnesota State Highway 43
  Minnesota State Highway 74
  Minnesota State Highway 76
  Minnesota State Highway 248

Public airports
 Winona Municipal Airport (ONA) (Max Conrad Field), NW of Winona

Adjacent counties

 Wabasha County - northwest
 Buffalo County, Wisconsin - north
 Trempealeau County, Wisconsin - northeast
 La Crosse County, Wisconsin - east
 Houston County - south
 Fillmore County - southwest
 Olmsted County - west

Protected areas

 Great River Bluffs State Park
 John A Latsch State Park
 Richard John Dorer Memorial Hardwood State Forest
 Upper Mississippi River National Wildlife and Fish Refuge (part)
 Whitewater State Park
 Whitewater State Wildlife Management Area (part)
 Callahan Unit
 McCarthy Ravine Unit
 South Branch Unit
 Upper South Branch Unit

Lakes

 Airport Lake
 Bartlet Lake
 Bollers Lake
 Hunters Lake
 Lake Goodview
 Lake Winona
 Rileys Lake

Demographics

2000 census

As of the 2000 United States census, there were 49,985 people, 18,744 households, and 11,696 families in the county. The population density was 79.8/sqmi (30.8/km2). There were 19,551 housing units at an average density of 31.2/sqmi (12.1/km2). The racial makeup of the county was 95.80% White, 0.77% Black or African American, 0.19% Native American, 1.87% Asian, 0.02% Pacific Islander, 0.53% from other races, and 0.81% from two or more races.  1.37% of the population were Hispanic or Latino of any race. 41.8% were of German, 13.9% Norwegian, 9.9% Polish and 7.4% Irish ancestry.

There were 18,744 households, out of which 30.20% had children under the age of 18 living with them, 51.30% were married couples living together, 7.80% had a female householder with no husband present, and 37.60% were non-families. 28.20% of all households were made up of individuals, and 10.50% had someone living alone who was 65 years of age or older.  The average household size was 2.46 and the average family size was 3.04.

The county population contained 22.80% under the age of 18, 18.60% from 18 to 24, 25.10% from 25 to 44, 20.50% from 45 to 64, and 13.10% who were 65 years of age or older. The median age was 33. For every 100 females there were 95.20 males. For every 100 females age 18 and over, there were 91.8 males.

The median income for a household in the county was $38,700, and the median income for a family was $49,845. Males had a median income of $31,926 versus $23,406 for females. The per capita income for the county was $18,077.  About 5.60% of families and 12.00% of the population were below the poverty line, including 9.8% of those under 18 and 9.3% of those age 65 or over.

In 2016, Winona County planning commissioners voted to approve new permits for existing commercial dog breeding operations, also known as "puppy mills", despite overwhelming evidence of animal cruelty and neglect. Due to the high number of kennels in the county, Winona county has earned the dubious title "Puppy Mill Capital of Minnesota".

2020 Census

Micropolitan Statistical Area

The United States Office of Management and Budget (OMB) has designated Winona County as the Winona, MN Micropolitan Statistical Area (µSA), with Winona as its principal city. The US Census Bureau ranked this µSA as the 591st most populous Core Based Statistical Area of the United States as of April 1, 2020.

Politics
Winona County voters have historically tended to vote Democratic, but the county has recently been trending more conservative. Winona County's seat is considered a college town due to the presence of Winona State University and Saint Mary's University of Minnesota. In 2016, the county backed Donald Trump, the first time a Republican presidential nominee carried the county since 1988. In 2020, the county very narrowly backed Joe Biden. In the 2022 elections, Winona County voted for the Republican nominee for all statewide offices, as well as for Republican Brad Finstad for U.S representative, a notable rightward shift from previous elections. Scott Jensen was the first Republican gubernatorial nominee to carry the county in 20 years, and Jim Schultz was the first Republican Attorney General nominee to carry it in 24 years.

Winona County is represented in the Minnesota House of Representatives by Steve Jacob (R) and Gene Pelowski (DFL). Jeremy Miller (R) and Steve Drazkowski (R) represent it in the Minnesota Senate. Winona County is in Minnesota's 1st Congressional District, which is represented by Brad Finstad (R).

Communities

Cities

 Altura
 Dakota
 Elba
 Goodview
 La Crescent (mostly in Houston County)
 Lewiston
 Minneiska (partly in Wabasha County)
 Minnesota City
 Rollingstone
 St. Charles
 Stockton
 Utica
 Winona (county seat)

Census-designated place
 Homer

Unincorporated communities

 Bethany
 Centerville
 Clyde
 Donehower
 Dresbach
 Fremont
 Lamoille
 Nodine
 Oakridge
 Pickwick
 Pine Creek
 Ridgeway
 Saratoga
 Troy
 Whitman
 Wilson
 Witoka
 Wyattville

Ghost towns

 Ashton
 Beaver
 Enterprise
 Grover
 Whitewater Falls
 Clyde

Townships

 Dresbach
 Elba
 Fremont
 Hart
 Hillsdale
 Homer
 Mount Vernon
 New Hartford
 Norton
 Pleasant Hill
 Richmond
 Rollingstone
 Saint Charles
 Saratoga
 Utica
 Warren
 Whitewater
 Wilson
 Wiscoy

See also
 National Register of Historic Places listings in Winona County, Minnesota

References

Further reading
 DeLorme's Minnesota Atlas and Gazetteer

External links
 Winona County
 Winona County Health and Demographic Data
 Winona County Board

 
Minnesota placenames of Native American origin
1854 establishments in Minnesota Territory
Minnesota counties on the Mississippi River